La casa en la playa (The House on the Beach) is a Mexican telenovela produced in 2000. Cynthia Klitbo and Sergio Goyri star as the protagonists, while Blanca Guerra and José Carlos Ruiz star as the antagonists.

Cast 
 Cynthia Klitbo as Paulina Villarreal de Rojo
 Sergio Goyri as Don Juan Carlos Cabrera 
 Blanca Guerra as Marina Villarreal
 Marga López as Doña Serena Rivas
 José Carlos Ruiz as Severo Rincón
 Mariana Levy as Elisa White de Villarreal
 David Ostrosky as César Villarreal
 Mario Cimarro  as Roberto Villarreal
 Yadhira Carrillo as Georgina Salas
 Sebastián Ligarde as Salvador Villarreal
 Ignacio López Tarso as Don Ángel Villarreal
 Lorena Velázquez as Elena White
 Margarita Magaña as Sofía Visconti
 Marlene Favela as Malena Núñez
 Esteban Franco as Teófilo
 Gerardo Albarrán as Marco Antonio Villasaña
 Valentino Lanús as Miguel Ángel Villarreal
 Paula Sánchez as Pía Villarreal de Estrada
 Ernesto Rivas as Hugo Estrada
 Luis Reynoso as Teniente Larios
 Marisol del Olmo as Mireya Rodríguez
 Anthony Álvarez as Demián Garza
 Katie Barberi as Florencia Uribe
 Hilda Aguirre as Casandra Del Junco
 Mario Iván Martínez as Harry Furman
 Mónica Miguel as María Estrada
 Carlos Amador as Efraín
 Rafael Amaya as Romualdo Reyes
 Mauricio Aspe as Gino Morali

References

External links 
 

2000 telenovelas
Mexican telenovelas
2000 Mexican television series debuts
2000 Mexican television series endings
Televisa telenovelas
Spanish-language telenovelas